Cody Dean McKay (born January 11, 1974) is a Canadian former Major League Baseball catcher who played for the Oakland Athletics in 2002 and for the St. Louis Cardinals in 2004.

Biography
A native of Vancouver, British Columbia, McKay attended Horizon High School and Arizona State University. In 1994, he played collegiate summer baseball in the Cape Cod Baseball League for the Yarmouth-Dennis Red Sox.

McKay was twice drafted and not signed. First, by the San Francisco Giants in the 48th round of the 1992 Major League Baseball draft (1335th overall) and by the St. Louis Cardinals in the 5th round of the 1995 Major League Baseball draft (127th overall). He was drafted by the Oakland Athletics in the 9th round of the 1996 Major League Baseball draft (255th overall) and did sign.

He is the son of former player and Arizona Diamondbacks first base coach Dave McKay. On December 13, 2007, he was implicated for use of banned performance-enhancing substances on page 197 of the Mitchell Report.

See also
 List of second-generation Major League Baseball players

References

External links

1974 births
Canadian expatriate baseball players in the United States
Oakland Athletics players
St. Louis Cardinals players
Major League Baseball catchers
Major League Baseball players from Canada
Living people
American people of Canadian descent
Sportspeople from Vancouver
Modesto A's players
Huntsville Stars players
Edmonton Trappers players
Sacramento River Cats players
Indianapolis Indians players
Memphis Redbirds players
Baseball people from British Columbia
Southern Oregon Timberjacks players
Midland RockHounds players
Yarmouth–Dennis Red Sox players
Anchorage Glacier Pilots players